Guides Joanne (est. 1841) was a series of French-language travel guide books to Europe founded by Adolphe Joanne and published in Paris. Routes followed the railways at first, and later volumes guided readers by province.


Titles
 
 
 
  circa 1856

1860s-1880s
 
 
 
 
 
 
 France: Le Nord. 1869. + index
 
 v.1: Turkey + index
 v.2: Egypt
 v.3: Syria

1890s-1900s
 
 Grece: Athenes. 1890
 Luxembourg. 1895
 
  circa 1896
 
 
 Les Vosges et l'Alsace. 1898. + contents
 
 Alger. 1901
 
 
 
 
 
 
  (in English)

1910s
 Belgique et Hollande. 1911. + index
 
 Vallée de la Meuse; Ardenne, Grotte de Han, Gd-Duché de Luxembourg. 1912

1920s

See also
Guide Bleu, est. 1919

References

Bibliography

External links

 Items related to Guides Joanne (via Digital Public Library of America)

Travel guide books
Series of books
Publications established in 1841
Books about France
Tourism in France
1841 establishments in France